Mandelkern is a surname. Notable people with the surname include:

Leo Mandelkern (1922–2006), American polymer chemist
Salomon Mandelkern (1846–1902), Ukrainian poet and author

See also
Mandelker